Adoxophyes croesus is a species of moth of the family Tortricidae. It is found on Sulawesi, an island in Indonesia.

References

Moths described in 1975
Adoxophyes
Moths of Indonesia